Nawid Mohammad Kabir (born 18 May 2001) is an Afghan cricketer. He made his first-class debut for Kabul Region in the 2019 Ahmad Shah Abdali 4-day Tournament on 22 April 2019. He made his List A debut on 15 October 2020, for Boost Region in the 2020 Ghazi Amanullah Khan Regional One Day Tournament.

References

External links
 

2001 births
Living people
Afghan cricketers
Boost Defenders cricketers
Kabul Eagles cricketers
Place of birth missing (living people)